Terebovlia Raion was a raion in Ternopil Oblast in western Ukraine. Its administrative center was the city of Terebovlia. The raion was abolished on 18 July 2020 as part of the administrative reform of Ukraine, which reduced the number of raions of Ternopil Oblast to three. The area of Terebovlia Raion was merged into Ternopil Raion. The last estimate of the raion population was 

At the time of disestablishment, the raion consisted of four hromadas:
 Ivanivka rural hromada with the administration in the selo of Ivanivka;
 Mykulyntsi settlement hromada with the administration in the urban-type settlement of Mykulyntsi;
 Terebovlia urban hromada with the administration in Terebovlia;
 Zolotnyky rural hromada with the administration in the selo of Zolotnyky.

See also
 Subdivisions of Ukraine

References

Former raions of Ternopil Oblast
1940 establishments in Ukraine
Ukrainian raions abolished during the 2020 administrative reform